Northwestern Region is one of the traditional eight regions of Iceland, located in the north of the island. The largest town in the region is Sauðárkrókur, with a population of 3000.

One of the primary attractions of the area is the basalt rock Hvítserkur, 15 meters high and resembles a dragon that throws its head to take a sip of water.

References

External links